Pins and Needles is the fourth studio album by Canadian rock band The Birthday Massacre. The album was released on September 14, 2010. The first single and video from the album, "In the Dark," premiered on September 7, 2010, directed and edited by M.Falcore and Rodrigo Gudiño of Rue Morgue.

Track listing

All tracks written and performed by Chibi, Rainbow, Michael Falcore, OE

Personnel
The band:
Chibi - lead vocals
Rainbow - rhythm guitar, synth/percussion programming, backing vocals
Michael Falcore - lead guitar, synth/percussion programming
O.E. - bass, backing vocals
Rhim -  drums
Owen -  keyboards
Rainbow and M. Falcore - producing and recording
Dave "Rave" Ogilvie and Rainbow - mixing
Dave "Rave" Ogilvie - mix engineer
Brock McFarlane - assistant mix engineer
Noah Mintz - mastering
Kevin James Maher - programming and editing
Mixed At: Mushroom Studios (Vancouver, Canada) & Dire Studios (Toronto, Canada)
Mastered At: Lacquer Channel
Design Artwork: Vincent Marcone, Cole Sullivan, James Furlong, Natalie Shau

Reviews
Allmusic  link
Review Rinse Repeat  link
Sputnikmusic  link
Musicfolio.com  link
Absolutepunknet (69%) link

Charts
On the issue date of September 23, 2010, Pins And Needles debuted at number 6 on the Billboard Top Heatseekers chart  and number 152 on the Top 200 chart. It stayed on the Heatseekers chart for 3 weeks.

Notes

Album artwork was created by illustrator and director Vincent Marcone of Johnny Hollow and MyPetSkeleton.com.

The Album was recorded in a basement studio in Dundas, Ontario, hometown of Rainbow and M.Falcore.

References

External links
The Birthday Massacre Official Site

2010 albums
The Birthday Massacre albums
Metropolis Records albums